Barba (which means "beard" in Spanish, Portuguese and Italian) is a surname. Notable people with the surname include:

People
 Antonella Barba (born 1986), U.S. singer and contestant on American Idol
 Ben Barba (born 1989), Australian rugby footballer
 Eric Barba, special effects artist
 Eugenio Barba (born 1936), Italian author and director
 Federico Barba (born 1993), Italian footballer
 Fidel LaBarba (1905–1981), U.S. boxer and sportswriter
 Javier Barba, lead guitar of Mexican rock band Los Depas
 Juan Barbas (born 1959), Argentine footballer
 María Ignacia Rodríguez de Velasco y Osorio Barba (1778–1851), figure in the society of Mexico City
 Paul Barbă Neagră (born 1929), Romanian film director
 Porfirio Barba-Jacob, pseudonym of Miguel Ángel Osorio Benítez, Colombian poet
 Victoria Barbă (1926–2020), Moldovan animated film director

Fictional characters
Rafael Barba, (Raúl Esparza) appearing on Law & Order: Special Victims Unit
Barbapapa, the title character, and name of the "species" of said character, of a series of children's books

See also
 The Barba river, a tributary of the Vologne in the French Vosges
Barba as the latin root of the word "beard"
 Barbas, in demonology
 Barbas (Charmed), a fictional character
 Barbas (surname)
 Barba is the last palace dungeon of the sixth dungeon in Zelda II: The Adventure of Link.  He is a serpent.  When Nintendo released Zelda II in Europe and America, they called the palace boss Barba, but this has since been retconned as Volvagia, which is his original name in the Japanese version of Zelda II.
 The 6th Colossus in Shadow of the Colossus